The Puerto Rico Billie Jean King Cup team represents Puerto Rico in the Billie Jean King Cup tennis competition and are governed by the Associación de Tenis de Puerto Rico.  They currently compete in the Americas Zone of Group II.

History
Puerto Rico competed in its first Fed Cup in 1992.  Their best result was reaching the World Group II Play-offs in 2005.

See also
Fed Cup
Puerto Rico Davis Cup team

External links

Billie Jean King Cup teams
Fed Cup
Fed Cup